Nautan is a Community development block and a town of Siwan district in Indian state of Bihar. It is one out of 13 blocks of Siwan Subdivision.

Nautan town is the headquarter of the Block.

Nautan block is divided into many Gram Panchayats and villages.

Politics
It is part of the ZIRADEI Assembly constituency.

Gram Panchayats
Gram Panchayats of Nautan Block 

Angouta
Gambhirpur
Khalawa
Khap banakat
Mathia
Murarpatti
Narakatia
Nautan
Semaria

See also
Siwan Subdivision
Administration in Bihar

References

External links

Villages in Siwan district
Community development blocks in Siwan district